Constantine Bohachevsky (June 17, 1884 - January 6, 1961), born in Manajiv, Ukraine, was an archbishop of the Ukrainian Catholic Church.  He was the first Ukrainian Catholic metropolitan in the United States.

External links
Catholic-Hierarchy
Diocese of Stamford, Connecticut
Archdiocese of Philadelphia

1961 deaths
1884 births
People from Ternopil Oblast
People from the Kingdom of Galicia and Lodomeria
Ukrainian Austro-Hungarians
Austro-Hungarian emigrants to the United States
Bishops in Pennsylvania
Eastern Catholic bishops in the United States
Ukrainian Eastern Catholics
Eastern Catholic archeparchs in North America
Archbishops of the Ukrainian Greek Catholic Church